Nangis - Les Loges is an aerodrome near Nangis, France. It is located 60 km south-east of Paris.

Traffic 
The aerodrome is open to light and ultralight aviation under visual flight rules. In 2014, it handled 30,000 aircraft movements. Nangis is the 53rd French aerodrome in terms of movements.

Facilities 
The airfield has 2 parallels runways (05/23) for airplanes. One is paved and measures 955 × 20 meters, the other is unpaved and measures 1025 × 60 meters. It also has a separate unpaved runway for ultralight aviation.

Access 
Nangis aerodrome is not served by public transport.

References 

Airports in Île-de-France